Grato Passage is an 8-storey mixed use building located at 37 Kostava street in Vera district of Tbilisi, Georgia. The building includes office and retail space in its 8450 square metres of floor areas as well as a parking for 100 cars. Construction was completed in 2010.
Developed by Benett and Benett Capital Ltd and designed by architectural firm AG & Partners the building facade consists of white travertine stone and light textured burgundy bricks. Building is connected to Philharmonic hall through a glassed walking bridge, which is the only one of its kind in the city.

In 2010, just before the construction was finished, Grato hosted Tbilisi Fashion Week. Its unfinished interior was used as a backdrop for fashion shows.

References

External links

Official website

References in popular culture
GRATO presents Tbilisi Fashion Week 

Buildings and structures in Tbilisi
Shopping malls established in 2010